Queens Sports Club Ground is a cricket ground in Bulawayo, Zimbabwe. It has been used for cricket matches since 1899 and has hosted international matches as well as domestic games. The venue is the Zimbabwe national cricket team's second-most used home ground, after Harare Sports Club in Harare. The first Test match at the venue was held in 1994 with Sri Lanka as the visiting side. The first One Day International (ODI) took place in 1996 with England Zimbabwe's opposition and the first Twenty20 International (T20I) on the ground was held in 2013 with Bangladesh the visitors. The ground hosted One Day International matches during the 2003 ICC Cricket World Cup and 2018 ICC World Cup Qualifier.

In cricket, a five-wicket haul (also known as a "five-for" or "fifer") refers to a bowler taking five or more wickets in a single innings. This is regarded as a notable achievement. This article details the five-wicket hauls taken on the ground in official international Test and One Day International matches.

The first bowler to take a five-wicket haul in a Test match on the ground was Zimbabwean Heath Streak against Pakistan in 1995. Streak took five wickets for 70 runs, with Pakistan's Wasim Akram also taking a five-wicket haul later in the same match. The best figures in Test cricket on the ground are the 8/109 taken by Zimbabwean spinner Paul Strang against New Zealand in 2000. Team-mate Adam Huckle has the best match figures in Test cricket on the ground, taking 11 wickets, including two five-wicket hauls, against New Zealand in 1995.

The first ODI five-wicket haul on the ground was also taken by Streak, who took 5/32 against India in 1997. New Zealand's Shane Bond as the best ODI figures on the ground, taking 6/19 against India in 2005. , no five-wicket hauls have been taken in Twenty20 International matches on the ground.

Key

Test match five-wicket hauls
A total of 23 five-wicket hauls have been taken in Test matches on the ground.

One Day International five-wicket hauls
Ten five-wicket hauls have been taken in ODIs on the ground.

See also
List of international cricket five-wicket hauls on Zimbabwe cricket grounds

Notes

References

External links
International five-wicket hauls at Queens Sports Club, Bulawayo, CricInfo

Queens Sports Club
Zimbabwean cricket lists